Mac and Chiz (stylized as Mac & Chiz) is a Philippine television sitcom that broadcast on TV5, it premiered on January 25, 2015. Starring Derek Ramsay and Empoy Marquez are the leading roles. The show airs every Sunday at 8:00pm after Who Wants To Be a Millionaire?.

Premise
It is about the twins Mac Vasquez (Character of Derek Ramsay) and Chiz Espinosa (character of Empoy Marquez), who are living with their different environments. Mac and his father Sir Chef Vasquez (character of Jun Sabayton) are managing their restaurant business, while Chiz and his mother Jaya (character of Diana Zubiri) are managing a cafeteria business.

Cast

Main cast
 Derek Ramsay as Mac Vasquez
 Empoy Marquez as Chiz Espinosa
 John Lapus as Mamu Chok
 Jojo Alejar as Greg Vasquez
 Bianca King as Candy

Supporting cast
 Ana Roces as Madam Peaches Vasquez
 Jun Sabayton as Ser Chef Vasquez
 Rubi rubi as Paning
 Carmina Manzano as Regina

Guest cast
 Epy Quizon as Choco
 Boy2 Quizon as Ham
 Victor Silayan as Vincent
 Roxanne Barcelo as Pie
 Wendell Ramos as Gene
 Gerhard Acao as Henry
 Bangs Garcia as Apple
 Mutya Johanna Datul as Francine
 April Gustilo as Sowie
 Carlos Agassi as Dodong
 Manny Castañeda as Mr. Ong
 Valerie Concepcion as Yamyam
 Mailes Kanapi as P.I.
 Onyok Velasco as chief

See also
 List of programs broadcast by TV5 (Philippine TV network)

References

External links
 
 

TV5 (Philippine TV network) original programming
Philippine television sitcoms
Philippine comedy television series
2015 Philippine television series debuts
2015 Philippine television series endings
Filipino-language television shows